Showboy is a 2002 mockumentary film that was produced by star Jason Buchtel, directed by stars Christian Taylor and Lindy Heymann, written by and starring the three. It has cameos by Whoopi Goldberg, Siegfried & Roy, Alan Ball and the cast of the television series Six Feet Under.

Plot 
The film, a mockumentary that viewers are meant to believe is real, features around real-life screenwriter Taylor. Taylor is solicited by director Heymann to be the subject in a British television documentary series about British writers working in Hollywood. On the first day of filming this documentary, Taylor is fired from his real-life job as a screenwriter on the dramatic television series Six Feet Under. He is unaware that the documentary crew knows this has occurred.

He then relocates to Las Vegas to pursue a dream of becoming a professional showboy (a chorus line dancer). He lies to the documentary crew, purporting to be doing research for a film project. It slowly becomes evident that he is desperate to find a new career, and at the same time he slowly begins to come out of the closet and pursue romance.

Credits
(Note: cast is playing fictional versions of themselves)
Christian Taylor as himself
Lindy Heymann as herself
Marilyn Milgrom as a producer in London
Joe Daly as himself
Erich Miller as himself
Jason Buchtel as himself
Aaron Porter as a dance instructor
Adrian Armas as himself
Billy Sameth as Billy

Reception
Showboy won Best Directorial Debut at the British Independent Film Awards and Best Film at the Milan International Film Festival.

References

External links

2002 films
2002 comedy-drama films
2002 LGBT-related films
American LGBT-related films
Gay-related films
LGBT-related romantic comedy-drama films
American mockumentary films
2002 directorial debut films
2000s English-language films
2000s American films